Louis Charles Jean Dumont (11 August 1911 – 19 November 1998) was a French anthropologist.

Dumont was born in Thessaloniki, in the Salonica Vilayet of the Ottoman Empire.  He taught at Oxford University during the 1950s, and was then director of the École des Hautes Études en Sciences Sociales (EHESS) in Paris. A specialist on the cultures and societies of India, Dumont also studied western social philosophy and ideologies.

Works
His works include Homo Hierarchicus: Essai sur le système des castes (1966), From Mandeville to Marx: The Genesis and Triumph of Economic Ideology (1977) and Essais sur l'individualisme: Une perspective anthropologique sur l'idéologie moderne (1983), in which he contrasts holism with individualism.

Dumont died, aged 87, in Paris.

See also
Alliance theory

References

External links

1911 births
1998 deaths
Writers from Thessaloniki
People from Salonica vilayet
French anthropologists
French Indologists
Academics of the University of Oxford
20th-century anthropologists